I'm a Celebrity...Get Me Out of Here! returned for its fifteenth series on 15 November 2015 on ITV.

On 11 October 2015, a 5-second teaser aired on ITV for the first time, with more short trailers following, with Ant & Dec yelling "Let's get ready to jungle!", a pun on their well-known song "Let's Get Ready to Rhumble".

Geordie Shore'''s Vicky Pattison won the show on 6 December 2015, with Union J singer George Shelley finishing runner up.		
This was the second time that a late-entry contestant had won the show, the first being Christopher Biggins in 2007.

Ant & Dec both returned as presenters of the main show, whilst Joe Swash and Laura Whitmore returned to present the ITV2 spin-off show, I'm a Celebrity...Get Me Out of Here! NOW!, alongside David Morgan, who replaced Rob Beckett.

Celebrities
The celebrity cast line-up for the fifteenth series was confirmed on 9 November 2015. Spencer Matthews withdrew on 20 November, because of health issues. Lady Colin Campbell also withdrew on 1 December, also for medical reasons.

Results and elimination
 Indicates that the celebrity was immune from the vote
 Indicates that the celebrity received the most votes from the public
 Indicates that the celebrity received the fewest votes and was eliminated immediately (no bottom two
 Indicates that the celebrity was named as being in the bottom two
 Indicates that the celebrity received the second fewest votes and were not named in the bottom two

Notes
 The celebrities were split into four teams for a set of challenges to earn immunity; Green (Lady C, Susannah and Yvette), Pink (Duncan, George and Vicky), Purple (Brian, Jorgie and Tony) and Yellow (Chris, Ferne and Kieron). The Pink team won, earning immunity.
 There was no elimination on Day 14, with the votes being carried over and added to the next day's results.
 There was no elimination on Day 18, due to Lady C's withdrawal. Viewers were given refunds for their votes for Day 18 and lines were reopened for the impending Day 19 eviction.
 The public were voting for who they wanted to win rather than to save.

Bushtucker trials
The contestants take part in daily trials to earn food. These trials aim to test both physical and mental abilities. The winner is usually determined by the number of stars collected during the trial, with each star representing a meal earned by the winning contestant for their camp mates. As of 2014, the public voted for who took part in the trials via the I'm a Celebrity...'' app, from iOS devices. From 2015, the public cannot vote via phone, and can also vote via Android devices.

 The public voted for who they wanted to face the trial
 The contestants decided who would face the trial
 The trial was compulsory and neither the public nor celebrities decided who took part

Notes
 The celebrities were split up into two teams, Red (George, Jorgie, Kieron, Lady C and Tony) and Yellow (Brian, Chris, Duncan, Susannah and Yvette), with Tony and Susannah picking the teams as captains. The teams then faced a series of challenges, which the yellow team won 2-1, therefore moving straight into 'Croc Creek', while the red team automatically faced the first bushtucker trial. Chris, ejected after the yellow team's challenge loss, joined them for the trial. The losing team also were up for the 2nd and 3rd Bushtucker Trials.
 Lady C refused to take part in this bushtucker trial.
 This was a head-to-head trial. Since Ferne won, she was allowed to immediately enter the camp; she chose Vicky to join her, meaning Spencer was forced to return to Snake Rock. 
 This was a head-to-head trial. Since Lady C won, she was allowed to return to Croc Creek, choosing George to take her place in Snake Rock. 
 Chris, Lady C and Tony were excluded from the trial on medical grounds. 
 Brian and Lady C were excluded from the trial on medical grounds. 
 This trial was previously meant for Lady C, however she refused to take part. 
 Tony was excluded from this trial on medical grounds.

Star count

Dingo Dollar challenges
Members from camp will take part in the challenge to win 'Dingo Dollars'. If they win them then they can then take the dollars to the 'Outback Shack', where they can exchange them for camp luxuries with Kiosk Keith. Two options are given and the celebrities can choose which they would like to win. However, to win their luxury, a question is asked to the celebrities still in camp via the telephone box. If the question is answered correctly, the celebrities can take the items back to camp. If wrong, they receive nothing and Kiosk Keith will close the shack.

 The celebrities got the question correct
 The celebrities got the question wrong

Notes
 A storm hit the jungle during the challenge and the celebrities were evacuated to the Bush Telegraph, so Ferne and Jorgie were unable to complete the challenge. However, they were given the Dollars and went to the Outback Shack to spend them once the storm had passed.

Jungle Vending Machine 
This year was the first ever time that a jungle vending machine was introduced. It was also the final time, as it has not returned since (2016-present). It was introduced in the 2nd episode, which Lady C and Yvette took part in. Lady C refused to take part, but Yvette was still allowed to. Due to her success in spelling out the correct word, which was later confirmed as 'Kangaroo', the celebrities received a key to unlock a door, which revealed a vending machine.

Ratings
Official ratings are taken from BARB.

References

External links
 

Episode list using the default LineColor
2015 British television seasons
15